Laminin subunit gamma-3 also known as LAMC3 is a protein that in humans is encoded by the LAMC3 gene.

Function 

Laminins, a family of extracellular matrix glycoproteins, are the major noncollagenous constituent of basement membranes. They have been implicated in a wide variety of biological processes including cell adhesion, differentiation, migration, signaling, neurite outgrowth and metastasis. Laminins are composed of 3 non identical chains: laminin alpha, beta and gamma (formerly A, B1, and B2, respectively) and they form a cruciform structure consisting of 3 short arms, each formed by a different chain, and a long arm composed of all 3 chains. Each laminin chain is a multidomain protein encoded by a distinct gene. Several isoforms of each chain have been described. Different alpha, beta and gamma chain isomers combine to give rise to different heterotrimeric laminin isoforms which are designated by Arabic numerals in the order of their discovery, i.e. alpha1beta1gamma1 heterotrimer is laminin 1.

The biological functions of the different chains and trimer molecules are largely unknown, but some of the chains have been shown to differ with respect to their tissue distribution, presumably reflecting diverse functions in vivo. This gene encodes the gamma chain isoform laminin, gamma 3. The gamma 3 chain is most similar to the gamma 1 chain, and contains all the 6 domains expected of the gamma chain. It is a component of laminin 12. The gamma 3 chain is broadly expressed in skin, heart, lung, and the reproductive tracts. In skin, it is seen within the basement membrane of the dermoepidermal junction at points of nerve penetration. However, it was also found that the gamma 3 is a prominent element of the apical surface of ciliated epithelial cells of lung, oviduct, epididymis, ductus deferens, and seminiferous tubules. The distribution of gamma 3-containing laminins along ciliated epithelial surfaces suggests that the apical laminins are important in the morphogenesis and structural stability of the ciliated processes of these cells.

A recent study found that LAMC3 plays a critical role in forming the convolution of the cerebral cortex. Particularly LAMC3 is expressed during the embryonic period, which contributes the formation of dentrites.

References

Further reading

External links
 
 

Laminins